Trisescaline (3,4,5-triethoxyphenethylamine) is a lesser-known phenethylamine prepared as a possible psychedelic drug.  It is an analog of mescaline. Trisescaline was first synthesized by Alexander Shulgin. In his book PiHKAL, both the minimum dosage and the duration are unknown. Trisescaline produces no effects. Very little data exists about the pharmacological properties, metabolism, and toxicity of trisescaline.

See also 
 Thiotrisescaline

References 

Phenethylamines
Phenol ethers